The 2010–11 Division 1 Féminine season was the 37th since its establishment. Lyon were the defending champions. The fixtures were announced in August 2010 and the season began on 5 September 2010 and ended early on 31 May 2011 in order to increase the fitness of national team players ahead of the 2011 FIFA Women's World Cup. There were two promoted teams from the Division 2 Féminine, replacing the two teams that were relegated from Division 1 Féminine following the 2009–10 season. A total of 12 teams competed in the league with two clubs suffering relegation to the second division, the Division 2 Féminine.

On 27 March 2011, Lyon successfully defended its title after defeating title rivals Montpellier 1–0 at the Stade Jules Rimet in Sussargues. The title is the club's fifth consecutive in the Division 1 Féminine and its ninth overall dating back to its FC Lyon years. The win also places Lyon in the 2011–12 edition of the UEFA Women's Champions League. Lyon eventually finished the season unbeaten. The runner-up place, which qualified for the Champions League too, was decided on the final match day in a direct encounter between Paris Saint-Germain and Montpellier. Paris ranked third before the match and had to win in order to overtake Montpellier, which they achieved with a 1–0 win courtesy of a goal in the 88th minute.[2] Paris will be making its debut in the UEFA Women's Champions League next season.

Teams

Changes in 2009–10 

On 2 May 2010, both the women's section of football clubs Rodez and Le Mans won their respective group to achieve promotion to the Division 1 Féminine. Rodez earned promotion following a 1–1 draw with AS Muret, who were in second place. Le Mans earned promotion after defeating ES Blanquefort 2–1.

Montigny-le-Bretonneux were the first club to suffer relegation to the second division faltering with two games remaining in league play. On the final day of the league season, Soyaux became the second and final club to fall following its 2–0 loss to Montpellier.

Teams promoted to Division 1 Féminine
 Le Mans
 Rodez

Teams relegated to Division 2 Féminine
 Soyaux
 Montigny-le-Bretonneux

Stadia and locations

Personnel and kits 

1 Subject to change during the season.

Managerial changes

League table 
Note: A win in D1 Féminine is worth 4 points, with 2 points for a draw and 1 for a defeat.

Results

Season statistics
Tonazzi was the topscorer award.

Top scorers

Awards

Player of the Year 

For the second consecutive season, the French Football Federation awarded a trophy to the best player of the Division 1 Féminine. The award was based on a points-system with each manager of each club in the league voting for two players not on their team following each match day. Depending on their selection, the two players voted by each manager are given points of either three or one. During the season, the points were added up every week and, following the season, the player with the most points was awarded the honour. The previous winner of the award was Lyon midfielder Eugénie Le Sommer, who won the award while playing for Stade Briochin. On 5 May 2011, Paris Saint-Germain midfielder Élise Bussaglia was given the Division 1 Féminine Best Player award for her performances during the season. In the season, which is still ongoing, Bussaglia appeared in 20 matches, scored ten goals, and issued four assists.

Last updated: 9 May 2011
Source: Best Player Standings

UNFP Women's Player of the Year 

The nominees for the UNFP Women's Player of the Year in the Division 1 Féminine. The winner was determined at the annual UNFP Awards, which was held on 22 May. The winner is displayed in bold.

Notable transfers
The summer transfer window for the 2010–11 Division 1 Féminine includes a host of transfers by French internationals and youth internationals. On 30 June, midfielder Eugénie Le Sommer confirmed that she would be departing her club, Stade Briochin, to join the defending champions Lyon. The following day, centre back Sabrina Viguier did the same joining Lyon on a fédéral contract. On 9 July, fellow international defender Ophélie Meilleroux joined Montpellier from Nord Allier Yzeure.

During the same offseason, Paris Saint-Germain recruited three youth internationals to the club signing Léa Rubio and Charlotte Lozè from Montpellier and under-19 star Léa Le Garrec from relegated club Montigny-le-Bretonneux. Montpellier later nullified the departures of Rubio and Lozè by signing under-20 team captain Kelly Gadéa and under-20 team member Charlotte Bilbault.

On 5 July, Saint-Étienne confirmed that the club had signed Swiss international Muriel Bouakaz to a contract. Bouakaz had previously played with Zürich in the Nationalliga A. On 9 July, Montpellier announced the addition of Japanese international Rumi Utsugi to the team. Utsugi joins the club from NTV Beleza.

References

External links
 Official site
 Standings and Statistics

Fra
1
2010